Tower is a 2016 American mostly-animated documentary film about the 1966 shootings at the University of Texas at Austin directed and produced by Keith Maitland.

The film follows the shooting from the perspectives of several survivors, recreating their recounts via actors filmed and later animated in rotoscoping. The film premiered on March 13, 2016, at South by Southwest, before receiving a limited release by Kino Lorber in the United States on September 28, 2016. It was later aired on television on the PBS series Independent Lens.

Summary
On August 1, 1966, Charles Whitman rode the elevator to the top floor of the University of Texas Tower in Austin, Texas and opened fire, holding the campus hostage for 96 minutes. When the gunshots were finally silenced, the toll included 16 dead, three dozen wounded, and a shaken nation left trying to understand what had happened. Archival footage is combined with rotoscopic animation in a dynamic, never-before-seen way to illustrate the action-packed untold stories of the witnesses, heroes and survivors.

Production
The film is based on a 2006 Texas Monthly article by Pamela Colloff, "96 Minutes." Maitland originated from New Jersey and attended UT Austin. Maitland read the article in 2006 and asked Colloff to have lunch with him. He suggested making a film about the incident during the meeting. Colloff became one of the executive producers of the film. Various University of Texas students worked on the film as interns.

To finance the film the creators opened an Indiegogo, generating almost $70,000 from over 330 people in six weeks. In the final few days alumni of UT offered up a matching grant.

Early on, Maitland realized that he and his team likely would not be able to film reenactments on the University campus, so they instead decided to opt for an animated aesthetic "to show the geography of the campus." Footage was mostly shot in Maitland's backyard and then animated by production company Minnow Mountain who was aided by pictures Maitland had shot around campus. Over 100 people were interviewed including at-the-time media members, police, students, and faculty, who had witnessed the events, but a few selective interviews were used.

Reception
On review aggregation website Rotten Tomatoes, the film has an approval rating of 99% based on 100 reviews, with an average rating of 8.5/10. The site's critical consensus reads, "Tower probes into a painful chapter of American history with sensitivity and grace -- and revisits its events from a valuable new perspective." Justin Chang of Variety wrote that the film is "a uniquely cinematic memorial that will be in demand from programmers and buyers as the 50th anniversary of the shootings approaches."

It also won numerous Best Documentary awards, including at the 2016 Austin Film Critics Association and the 2018 News & Documentary Emmy Awards.

References

External links
 
 Tower at Independent Lens
 
 Tower at Indiegogo
 Colloff, Pamela. "96 Minutes." Texas Monthly. August 2006.
 Teague, Rachael. "Filmmakers discuss “Tower” documentary." KXAN. August 1, 2015.
"Archival Film in Tower," video showing the array of archival footage from the Texas Archive of the Moving Image collection featured in the documentary.

2016 animated films
2016 films
American animated documentary films
American films with live action and animation
Crowdfunded films
Films about snipers
Films based on newspaper and magazine articles
Indiegogo projects
University of Texas at Austin
Films set in 1966
Films set in the 1960s
2010s American animated films
University of Texas tower shooting
2010s English-language films
Rotoscoped films
Animated documentary films